Bertie & Elizabeth is a 2002 television film directed by Giles Foster and produced by Carlton Television. The film explores the relationship between King George VI and his wife Queen Elizabeth from their first meeting to the King's death in the winter of 1952. Bertie & Elizabeth was commissioned especially for the Golden Jubilee of Elizabeth II and was first broadcast on ITV1 on 4 June 2002, only two months after the death of Queen Elizabeth, The Queen Mother. The role of Queen Mary was portrayed by Dame Eileen Atkins, a role she again played in season one of the part-fact, part-fictional royal TV drama The Crown in 2016.

Plot
The film begins with the initial meeting between the then Duke of York and Lady Elizabeth Bowes-Lyon. The television drama then moves on through their courtship, marriage, and succession to the throne after the abdication of Edward VIII. We also see the two royals dealing with the events of the Second World War, as Buckingham Palace is hit and partially destroyed by a Luftwaffe bomb.

The film portrays King George VI's struggle to overcome his stammer, the fear he felt towards his father and the punishing stress the King was placed under during the abdication crisis of 1936.

Cast
 James Wilby as Bertie, later King George VI
 Juliet Aubrey as Elizabeth, later Queen Elizabeth
 Alan Bates as King George V
 Eileen Atkins as Queen Mary 
 Charles Edwards as David, later King Edward VIII, then Duke of Windsor
 Oliver Ford Davies as Archbishop Lang 
 Michael Elwyn as Lionel Logue
 Amber Rose Sealey as Wallis Simpson
 Barbara Leigh-Hunt as Lady Mabell Airlie
 David Ryall as Winston Churchill
 Paul Brooke as Tommy Lascelles
 David Burke as Lord John Reith
 Robert Hardy as President Roosevelt
 Helen Ryan as Queen Wilhelmina
 Elisabeth Dermot Walsh as Princess Elizabeth known as "Lillibet", the future Queen Elizabeth II
 Corin Redgrave as General Montgomery 
 Denis Lill as Clement Attlee
 Terence Harvey as Sir Clement Price Thomas
 Jeremy Child as Sir Samuel Hoare

See also
The King's Speech, a film similarly addressing George VI's stammer.
The Crown (TV series), Eileen Atkins reprised her role as Queen Mary in season 1, while Charles Edwards took a role of Queen Elizabeth II's private secretary Sir Martin Charteris in seasons 3 and 4.

References

External links
 

2002 television films
2002 films
British television films
British biographical films
Biographical films about British royalty
Cultural depictions of George VI
Cultural depictions of George V
Cultural depictions of the Edward VIII abdication crisis
Cultural depictions of Bernard Montgomery
Cultural depictions of Winston Churchill
Queen Elizabeth The Queen Mother
Cultural depictions of Elizabeth II
Cultural depictions of Franklin D. Roosevelt
Cultural depictions of Wilhelmina of the Netherlands
Films directed by Giles Foster
2000s English-language films
2000s British films